Tamagnini Manuel Gomes Batista (born 20 November 1949), known as Nené, is a retired Portuguese professional footballer. A prolific striker, he played his entire career with Benfica, appearing in nearly 600 official games for the club and winning 19 titles, a record for several years.

Playing 66 times for Portugal and scoring 22 goals, Nené represented the nation at Euro 1984.

Club career
Born in Leça da Palmeira, Nené made his professional debuts with S.L. Benfica in 1968, and remained a key fixture with the club until his retirement almost twenty years later, at nearly 37. In the 1972–73 season, he was a star player for a side which became Primeira Liga champion without a single defeat (28 matches won – 23 consecutively – out of 30): the team scored 101 goals, breaking 100 for only the second time in its history.

Nené was the Portuguese Footballer of the Year in 1971 and also runner-up in 1972, which was achieved whilst competing with teammate Eusébio. He ranked second in Benfica's scoring lists in European competitions with 28 goals in 75 appearances, and played in the 1982–83 UEFA Cup finals, in an aggregate loss to R.S.C. Anderlecht.

As a player, Nené won 11 national championships with his only club. After ending his career, with overall totals of 577 games and 361 goals, he became a youth coach at the Estádio da Luz.

International career
Nené earned 66 caps for Portugal, ranking joint-ninth (with Simão Sabrosa) in the goalscoring charts at 22. He was their record appearance maker until 1994, when it was broken by FC Porto's João Domingos Pinto.

Nené made his debut on 21 April 1971, in a 2–0 home win against Scotland for the UEFA Euro 1972 qualifiers. Selected for the Euro 1984 tournament, he netted the game's only goal against Romania in the last group stage encounter, becoming the oldest player to score in the European championship finals at 34 years and 213 days; his effort led the national team to the semi-finals versus hosts France, where he played as a substitute but could not help avoid the 2–3 extra time defeat.

Nené's record was only broken 24 years later, when Ivica Vastić scored for Austria at Euro 2008 against Poland.

International goals

|}

Honours

Club
Benfica
Primeira Divisão: 1968–69, 1970–71, 1971–72, 1972–73, 1974–75, 1975–76, 1976–77, 1980–81, 1982–83, 1983–84
Taça de Portugal (7): 1969–70, 1971–72, 1979–80, 1980–81, 1982–83, 1984–85, 1985–86
Supertaça Cândido de Oliveira: 1980, 1985
Taça de Honra Lisbon FA (8)

Individual
Portuguese League: Top Scorer 1980–81, 1983–84
Portuguese Footballer of the Year: 1971

See also
List of one-club men

References

External links
 
 
 

1949 births
Living people
Sportspeople from Matosinhos
Portuguese footballers
Association football forwards
Primeira Liga players
S.L. Benfica footballers
Portugal international footballers
UEFA Euro 1984 players